Diocese of Harrisburg may refer to:
Roman Catholic Diocese of Harrisburg
Episcopal Diocese of Central Pennsylvania or the Episcopal Diocese of Harrisburg